These are the lists of entries of 2018 BWF World Championships  (World Badminton Championships) qualification.

Overview

Events 
This event holds men's singles and doubles, women's singles and doubles, and mixed doubles.

Number of players/member association quota 
This event's total limit of eligibility players is 400 players, the following charts are the rules and the distribution.

Participating players

Number of participant

Men's singles 
Due to the phase 2 updated by BWF, the following chart is the invitation results.

Women's singles 
Due to the phase 2 updated by BWF, the following chart is the invitation results.

Men's doubles 
Due to the phase 2 updated by BWF, the following chart is the invitation results.

Women's doubles 
Due to the phase 2 updated by BWF, the following chart is the invitation results.

Mixed doubles 
Due to the phase 2 updated by BWF, the following chart is the invitation results.

References

External links 
Official website
BWF website

qual
Qualification for sports events